Kepong–Selayang Highway (Selangor state route B21) is a major highway in Klang Valley region, Selangor, Malaysia. It is also a shortcut route to Rawang from Kepong and Sungai Buloh.

List of junctions

Highways in Malaysia
Roads in Selangor